Shoals High School is a high school in Shoals, Indiana, United States. Its athletic nickname is the "Jug Rox" and it participates in the Blue Chip Conference.

See also
 List of high schools in Indiana
 Blue Chip Conference
 Shoals, Indiana

References

External links
 

Public high schools in Indiana
High schools in Southwestern Indiana
Schools in Martin County, Indiana
Blue Chip Conference